Staffordshire County Cricket Club was established on 24 November 1871. It has since played minor counties cricket from 1895 and played List A cricket from 1971 to 2005, using a different number of home grounds during that time. Their first home minor counties fixture in 1895 was against Northamptonshire at the County Ground, Stoke-on-Trent, while their first home List A match came 76 years later against Glamorgan in the 1971 Gillette Cup at Trentham Road, Stoke-on-Trent.

The 38 grounds that Staffordshire have used for home matches since 1895 are listed below, with statistics complete through to the end of the 2014 season.

Grounds

List A
Below is a complete list of grounds used by Staffordshire County Cricket Club when it was permitted to play List A matches. These grounds have also held Minor Counties Championship and MCCA Knockout Trophy matches.

Minor Counties
Below is a complete list of grounds used by Staffordshire County Cricket Club in Minor Counties Championship and MCCA Knockout Trophy matches.

Notes

References

Staffordshire County Cricket Club
Cricket grounds in Staffordshire
Staffordshire